Carbon pricing (or  pricing), also known as cap and trade (CAT) or emissions trading scheme (ETS), is a method for nations to reduce global warming. The cost is applied to greenhouse gas emissions in order to encourage polluters to reduce the combustion of coal, oil and gas – the main driver of climate change. The method is widely agreed and considered to be efficient.

A carbon price usually takes the form of a carbon tax or carbon emission trading, a requirement to purchase allowances to emit.

21.7% of global GHG emissions are covered by carbon pricing in 2021, a major increase due to the introduction of the Chinese national carbon trading scheme. Regions with carbon pricing include most European countries and Canada.  On the other hand, top emitters like India, Russia, the Gulf states and many US states have not yet introduced carbon pricing. Australia abolished its carbon pricing scheme. In 2020, carbon pricing generated $53bn in revenue.

According to the Intergovernmental Panel on Climate Change, a price level of $135–5500 in 2030 and $245–13,000 per ton  in 2050 would be needed to drive carbon emissions to stay below the 1.5°C limit. 

Latest models of the social cost of carbon calculate a damage of more than $3000/t  as a result of economy feedbacks and falling global GDP growth rates, while policy recommendations range from about $50 to $200. Many carbon pricing schemes including the ETS in China remain below $10/t. One exception is the European Union Emissions Trading System (EU-ETS) which exceeded 100€/t ($) in February 2023.

A carbon tax is generally favoured on economic grounds for its simplicity and stability, while cap-and-trade theoretically offers the possibility to limit allowances to the remaining carbon budget. Current implementations are only designed to meet certain reduction targets.

Concepts

Emissions trading 

In a cap-and-trade design, the market for permits automatically adjusts the carbon price to a level that insures that the cap is met. The government establishes an emissions cap, for example 1000 t per year. Then it either gives the allowances to stakeholders, or auctions them off to the highest bidder. After the permits have been distributed, they can be traded privately. Emitters without the required allowances face a penalty that would cost more than buying permits. If the cap is low, permits will be in short supply (scarcity) and the price of permits will be high.

The EU ETS uses this method. In practice it resulted in a fairly strong carbon price from 2005 to 2009, but that was later undermined by an oversupply as well as by the Great Recession. Recent policy changes have led to a steep increase of the carbon price since 2018, exceeding 100€/t ($) in February 2023.

Carbon tax 

With a carbon tax, the government and not the market sets the price of carbon. In principle all sources of  emissions should be taxed at the same rate per ton of  emitted. In practice, different fuels and different fuel uses may be taxed at different rates and the resulting tax may still be referred to as a carbon tax.

Hybrid designs 
Cap-and-trade systems can include price stability provisions with floor and ceiling limits. Such designs are often referred to as hybrid designs. To the extent the price is controlled by these limits, it can be considered a tax.

Revenue policies 
Standard proposals for using carbon revenues include
 a return to the public on a per-capita basis This can compensate the risk of rising energy prices reaching high levels as long as cheap wind and solar power is not available yet. Rich people who tend to have a larger carbon footprint would pay more while poorer people can even benefit from such a regulation. 
 subsidies accelerating the transition to renewable energy
 research, public transport, car sharing and other policies that promote carbon neutrality
 subsidies for negative emissions: Depending on the technology, such as PyCCS or BECCS, the cost for generating negative emissions is about $150–165 per ton of CO2. The removal past emissions – 1,700 Gt in total – can theoretically be addressed by auctioning allowances starting with a price that exceeds the removal costs of the proposed emissions.

Social cost of carbon 

The exact monetary damage caused by a tonne of  depends on climate and economic feedback effects and remains to some degree uncertain. Latest calculations show an increasing trend. Dynamic models include discount rates. This results in lower costs in the current state and higher costs once that carbon budgets are used up.

Price levels 
About one third of the systems stays below $10/t, the majority is below $40. One exception is the steep incline in the EU-ETS reaching $60 in September 2021. Sweden and Switzerland are the only countries with more than $100/t.

Market price surge in fossil fuels 
Unexpected spikes in natural gas prices and commodities such as oil and coal in 2021 caused a debate whether a carbon price increase should be postponed to avoid additional social burden. On the other hand, a redistribution on a per-capita-basis would even release poorer households which tend to consume less energy compared to wealthier parts of the population. The higher the high carbon price the greater the relief. Looking at individual situations though, the compensation would not apply to commuters in rural areas or people living in houses with poor insulation. They neither have liquidity to invest into solutions using less fossil fuels and would be dependent on credits or subsidies.
If the fossil price surge persists, the necessity for an additional carbon price to gain competitiveness for renewable energies comes into question. On the other hand, a carbon price still helps to provide an incentive to use more effective fossil fuel technologies such as CCGT gas turbines in contrast to high-emission coal.

Scope and coverage 
In the relevant countries with ETS and taxes, about 40% to 80% of emissions are covered. The schemes differ much in detail. They include or exclude fuels, transport, heating, agriculture or other greenhouse gases apart from  like methane or fluorinated gases. In many EU member states like France or Germany, there is a coexistence of two systems: The EU-ETS covers power generation and large industry emissions while national ETS or taxes put a different price on petrol, natural gas and oil for private consumption.

Other taxes and price components 
The final consumer price for fuels and electric energy depends on individual tax regulations and conditions in each country. Though carbon pricing is playing an increasing role, energy taxes, VAT, utility expenses and other components are still the main cause for completely different price levels between countries.

Impact on retail prices
The table gives examples for a carbon price of $100 or 100 units of any other currency accordingly. Food calculation is all based on  equivalents including the high impact of methane emissions.

Economics of carbon pricing 

Many economic properties of carbon pricing hold regardless of whether carbon is priced with a cap or a tax. However, there are a few important differences. Cap-based prices are more volatile and so they are riskier for investors, consumers and for governments that auction permits. Also, caps tend to short-out the effect of non-price policies such as renewables subsidies, while carbon taxes do not.

Efficiency of carbon pricing 
Carbon pricing is considered by many economists to be the most efficient way to reduce emissions. This means that it reduces emissions for the least possible cost, where these costs include the cost of efficiency measures as well as the cost of the inconvenience of making do with less of the goods and services provided by fossil fuels. This efficiency comes about by eliminating a market failure (the un-priced external costs of carbon emissions) at its source – by pricing these costs. This is best explained by example:

Consider an example market with 100 emitters, each of which gets a different benefit from using carbon (and emitting ). Each emitter would like to use enough fossil fuel to emit 1 ton per year. Suppose the benefits from that ton range from $1 for the user with the least need for carbon to $100 (in $1 increments) for the user who would benefit most. Now consider this market under two different pricing policies, a cap-and-trade policy and a tax. Further suppose that the tax is $60.01/ton and the cap has been set at 40 tons, so that 40 one-ton permits have been issued.

Under the tax, it is clear that no one with an emission value of less than $60.01 will emit because they would have to pay $60.01 for less than $60.01 in value. So the 40 carbon users with values ranging from $61 to $100 will pay the tax and emit their ton of carbon.

Under cap and trade, suppose the price turned out be less than $60.01 and someone other than a top-40 emitter (ranked by value) got a permit. In that case a top-40 emitter without a permit would offer that "someone" more than $60 and they would sell because that is more than the value they would get from using the permit themselves. This will drive the price up to the point where only top-40 emitters get permits and the price is a little more (say $60.01) than any bottom-60 emitter would pay.

Several conclusions are drawn by economics from a somewhat more rigorous application of this type of analysis. First, the same people end up emitting under a tax and under a cap that pushes the price equally high. Second, only the highest value emitters end up emitting. Third, the total value of emitters is greater than under any other distribution of permits. This final conclusion is the reason carbon pricing is considered "efficient" by economists.

Finally, economics points out that since regulators would have an extremely hard time finding out the value that each emitter receives from emitting, this efficient outcome is extremely unlikely if the regulator chooses who can emit and who cannot. This is why economics teaches that command and control regulation will not be efficient, and will be less efficient than a market mechanism, such as carbon pricing. In the words of the IPCC, "[renewable energy subsidies] are less efficient alternatives to carbon taxes and emissions trading for inducing mitigation" (section 3.8.1.2).

Taxes vs emissions trade
Emissions trading works by setting a quantitative limit on the emissions produced by emitters. As a result, the price automatically adjusts to this target. This is the main advantage compared to a fixed carbon tax. A carbon tax is considered easier to enforce on a broad-base scale than cap-and-trade programs. The simplicity and immediacy of a carbon tax has been proven effective in British Columbia, Canada – enacted and implemented in five months. A hybrid cap-and-trade program puts a limit on price increases and, in some cases, sets a floor price as well. The upper limit is set by adding more allowances to the market at a set price while the floor price is maintained by not allowing sales into the market at a price below the floor.  The Regional Greenhouse Gas Initiative, for example, sets an upper limit on allowance prices through its cost containment provision.

However, industries may successfully lobby to exempt themselves from a carbon tax. It is therefore argued that with emissions trading, polluters have an incentive to cut emissions, but if they are exempted from a carbon tax, they have no incentive to cut emissions. On the other hand, freely distributing emission permits could potentially lead to corrupt behaviour.

Most cap and trade programs have a descending cap, usually a fixed percentage every year, which gives certainty to the market and guarantees that emissions will decline over time. With a tax, there can be estimates of reduction in carbon emissions, which may not be sufficient to change the course of climate change. A declining cap gives allowance for firm reduction targets and a system for measuring when targets are met. It also allows for flexibility, unlike rigid taxes. Providing emission permits (also called allowances) under emissions trading is preferred in situations where a more accurate target level of emissions certainty is needed.

Carbon leakage
Carbon leakage is the effect that regulation of emissions in one country/sector has on the emissions in other countries/sectors that are not subject to the same regulation. There is no consensus over the magnitude of long-term carbon leakage.

The leakage rate is defined as the increase in CO2 emissions outside the countries taking domestic mitigation action, divided by the reduction in emissions of countries taking domestic mitigation action. Accordingly, a leakage rate greater than 100% means that actions to reduce emissions within countries had the effect of increasing emissions in other countries to a greater extent, i.e., domestic mitigation action had actually led to an increase in global emissions.

Estimates of leakage rates for action under the Kyoto Protocol ranged from 5% to 20% as a result of a loss in price competitiveness, but these leakage rates were considered very uncertain. For energy-intensive industries, the beneficial effects of Annex I actions through technological development were considered possibly substantial. However, this beneficial effect had not been reliably quantified. On the empirical evidence they assessed, Barker et al. (2007) concluded that the competitive losses of then-current mitigation actions, e.g., the EU-ETS, were not significant.

Under the EU ETS rules Carbon Leakage Exposure Factor is used to determine the volumes of free allocation of emission permits to industrial installations.

A general perception among developing countries is that discussion of climate change in trade negotiations could lead to green protectionism by high-income countries Eco-tariffs on imports ("virtual carbon") consistent with a carbon price of $50 per ton of CO2 could be significant for developing countries. In 2010, World Bank commented that introducing border tariffs could lead to a proliferation of trade measures where the competitive playing field is viewed as being uneven. Tariffs could also be a burden on low-income countries that have contributed very little to the problem of climate change.

Interactions with renewable energy policies 

Cap-and-trade and carbon taxes interact differently with non-price policies such as renewable energy subsidies. The IPCC explains this as follows:A carbon tax can have an additive environmental effect to policies such as subsidies for the supply of RE. By contrast, if a cap-and-trade system has a binding cap (sufficiently stringent to affect emission-related decisions), then other policies such as RE subsidies have no further impact on reducing emissions within the time period that the cap applies [emphasis added].Consider the following hypothetical example of this effect. Suppose the price of permits in the EU would have been €30, and Germany would have needed to purchase 20 million permits. If Germany then decided to subsidize investment in wind turbines that would not have been built with a €30 carbon price, and they were built and operated, then Germany would need fewer permits. Hence the permits it would have used will go somewhere else, perhaps to Poland. Poland would then use them to emit more CO2, perhaps by burning coal. The result is that Germany emits less CO2 and this allows others to emit just as much more. So the cap is met, as it must be, and the total CO2 emitted is unchanged by the renewable subsidies and wind turbines.

Notice that this same effect applies as well to an individual who chooses to buy an electric car under a cap-and-trade system. The car emits less CO2, so fewer permits are used up by this person's driving. These permits will be bought by others and used. So the same amount of CO2 (the cap) will be emitted regardless of the purchase of the electric car. It the buyer's intent was to reduce carbon emissions, the cap has thwarted their efforts by encouraging others to emit exactly as much as they abated their emissions. As the IPCC noted, a carbon tax does not have this effect.

Cost pass-through 

Carbon pricing sometimes charges the emitter and sometimes charges the fossil fuel supplier. Fortunately the right person always ends up bearing the cost imposed by the policy. The government may tax or cap an oil refinery based on all the carbon it buys in the form of oil. But the refinery does not emit 90%+ of that carbon. Instead it makes gasoline and sells that to gas stations, who sell it to drivers, who emit the carbon. In this case the refinery passes on the cost of its carbon permits or carbon tax (just as it passes on all marginal costs), and the gas stations pay those costs. But then the gas stations pass on their cost to the drivers. So drivers actually bear the cost of carbon pricing, and that is as it should be, because driving is the real reason for the emissions.

But economics does not view this as a moral matter. Rather, economics points out that when the cost goes up, if drivers do not find driving their SUV (for example) worth the extra cost, they will switch and drive their sports car, ride their bike or take public transportation. And that is the point of carbon pricing. If all alternatives are unappealing, that means the driver really is getting more benefit that the cost she is causing. So again we have the right outcome – provided the carbon price equals the social cost.

Carbon pricing and economic growth 
According to a 2020 study carbon prices have not harmed economic growth in wealthy industrialized democracies.

In order for such a business model to become attractive, the subsidies would therefore have to exceed this value. Here, a technology openness could be the best choice, as a reduction in costs due to technical progress can be expected. Already today, these costs of generating negative emissions are below the costs of CO2 of $220 per ton, which means that a state-subsidized business model for creating negative emissions already makes economic sense today. In sum, while a carbon price has the potential to reduce future emissions, a carbon subsidy has the potential to reduce past emissions.

Economic views on carbon pricing 

In late 2013, William Nordhaus, president of the American Economic Association, published The Climate Casino, which culminates in a description of an international "carbon price regime". Such a regime would require national commitments to a carbon price, but not to a specific policy. Carbon taxes, caps, and hybrid schemes could all be used to satisfy such a commitment. At the same time Martin Weitzman, a leading climate economist at Harvard, published a theoretical study arguing that such a regime would make it far easier to reach an international agreement, while a focus on national targets would continue to make it nearly impossible. Nordhaus also makes this argument, but less formally.

Similar views have previously been discussed by Joseph Stiglitz and have previously appeared in a number of papers. The price-commitment view appears to have gained major support from independent positions taken by the World Bank and the International Monetary Fund (IMF).

The "Economists' Statement on Climate Change" was signed by over 2500 economists including nine Nobel Laureates in 1997. This statement summarizes the economic case for carbon pricing as follows:The most efficient approach to slowing climate change is through market-based policies. In order for the world to achieve its climatic objectives at minimum cost, a cooperative approach among nations is required – such as an international emissions trading agreement. The United States and other nations can most efficiently implement their climate policies through market mechanisms, such as carbon taxes or the auction of emissions permits.This statement argues that carbon pricing is a "market mechanism" in contrast to renewable subsidies or direct regulation of individual sources of carbon emissions and hence is the way that the "United States and other nations can most efficiently implement their climate policies."

Carbon offsets for individuals and businesses may also be purchased through carbon offset retailers like Carbonfund.org Foundation.

A new quantity commitment approach, suggested by Mutsuyoshi Nishimura, is for all countries to commit to the same global emission target. The "assembly of governments" would issue permits in the amount of the global target and all upstream fossil-fuel providers would be forced to buy these permits.

In 2019 the UN Secretary General asked governments to tax carbon.

The economics of carbon pricing is much the same for taxes and cap-and-trade. Both prices are efficient; they have the same social cost and the same effect on profits if permits are auctioned. However, some economists argue that caps prevent non-price policies, such as renewable energy subsidies, from reducing carbon emissions, while carbon taxes do not. Others argue that an enforced cap is the only way to guarantee that carbon emissions will actually be reduced; a carbon tax will not prevent those who can afford to do so from continuing to generate emissions.

Besides cap and trade, emission trading can refer to project-based programs, also referred to as a credit or offset programs. Such programs can sell credits for emission reductions provided by approved projects. Generally there is an additionality requirement that states that they must reduce emissions more than is required by pre-existing regulation. An example of such a program is the Clean Development Mechanism under the Kyoto Protocol. These credits can be traded to other facilities where they can be used for compliance with a cap-and-trade program. Unfortunately the concept of additionality is difficult to define and monitor, with the result that some companies purposefully increased emissions in order to get paid to eliminate them.

Cap-and-trade programs often allow "banking" of permits. This means that permits can be saved and can be used in the future. This allows an entity to over-comply in early periods in anticipation of higher carbon prices in subsequent years. This helps to stabilize the price of permits.

Notes

References

Sources 
 Global Warming of 1.5 ºC —.

Impact

External links 
Carbon pricing support:
 Our Climate Put A Price On It campaign
 Citizens' Climate Lobby: Putting a Price on Carbon
Carbon tax support:
 Carbon Tax Center — Argues for a carbon tax
 Carbon tax survey results — Some taxes have majority support
 WSJ: Cap-and-Trade's Unlikely Critics: Its Creators — They are critical of using it for carbon
Cap and trade:
 European Emissions Trading System — Web site of largest cap and trade experiment
 Regional Greenhouse Gas Initiative (RGGI) — Cap and Trade in the US Northeast
 California's Cap and Trade Program — The California Air Resources Board
 Environmental Defense Fund — Report on California's Cap and Trade
 The Way Forward Report — Design Principals for Ontario's New Cap and Trade System

Emission reduction commitments (targets):
 CDM Rulebook — Defines Kyoto commitments
 UN Climate Change Framework — Lists national commitments for 2020
Price commitments
 The Price Carbon Project — Quotes & papers from Nordhaus, Stiglitz, Weitzman, Dion, etc.
 Pricing Carbon Initiative — US focused effort for carbon-pricing commitments

Carbon finance
Fossil fuels
Subsidies
Environmental tax